Miloš Karišik (Serbian Cyrillic: Милош Каришик; born 7 October 1988) is a Serbian professional footballer who plays as a centre-back for Bosnian Premier League club Sloboda Tuzla.

Club career
Karišik came through the youth system at Partizan, alongside Miloš Bosančić, Nenad Marinković, and Miralem Sulejmani, among others. He made his senior debuts with affiliated side Teleoptik, making over 100 competitive appearances over the course of six seasons. In the 2011 winter transfer window, Karišik joined Serbian SuperLiga side Smederevo until the end of the campaign.

In the summer of 2011, Karišik was transferred to Czech club Slovan Liberec. He spent five seasons there, winning one Czech First League title and one Czech Cup trophy. During his stay at the club, Karišik collected 62 appearances in all competitions, failing to make any in his final season.

In July 2016, after spending five years abroad, Karišik returned to his homeland and signed with Javor Ivanjica. He then signed with Bosnian Premier League club Krupa in July 2018. Ahead of the 2019–20 season, Karišik joined Dinamo Pančevo.

On 22 July 2020, he came back to Krupa, signing a contract with the club. Karišik played his first official game since his return on 2 August 2020, a league match against Sarajevo.

International career
Karišik represented Serbia at the 2007 UEFA European Under-19 Championship.

Career statistics

Club

Honours
Slovan Liberec
Czech First League: 2011–12
Czech Cup: 2014–15

Notes

References

External links

1988 births
Living people
Sportspeople from Pančevo
Serbian footballers
Serbia and Montenegro footballers
Serbian expatriate footballers
Serbian expatriate sportspeople in the Czech Republic
Expatriate footballers in the Czech Republic
Serbian expatriate sportspeople in Bosnia and Herzegovina
Expatriate footballers in Bosnia and Herzegovina
Serbian First League players
Serbian SuperLiga players
Czech First League players
Premier League of Bosnia and Herzegovina players
FK Teleoptik players
FK Smederevo players
FC Slovan Liberec players
FK Javor Ivanjica players
FK Krupa players
FK Dinamo Pančevo players
FK Sloboda Tuzla players
Serbia youth international footballers
Association football defenders